A partial lunar eclipse took place on 25 April 2013, the first of three lunar eclipses in 2013. Only a tiny sliver (1.48%) of the Moon was covered by the Earth's umbral shadow at maximum eclipse, but the entire northern half of the Moon was darkened from being inside the penumbral shadow. This was one of the shortest partial eclipses of the Moon for the 21st century, lasting 27 minutes. This was the last of 58 umbral lunar eclipses of Lunar Saros 112.

Visibility 

It was visible over Europe, Africa, Asia, and Australia.

Gallery

Related eclipses

Eclipses of 2013 
 A partial lunar eclipse on 25 April.
 An annular solar eclipse on 10 May.
 A penumbral lunar eclipse on 25 May.
 A penumbral lunar eclipse on 18 October.
 A hybrid solar eclipse on 3 November.

This eclipse was one of four lunar eclipses in a short-lived series at the ascending node of the Moon's orbit.

The lunar year series repeats after 12 lunations or 354 days, shifting back by about 10 days in consecutive years. Because of the date shift, the Earth's shadow will be about 11 degrees west in sequential events.

Saros series

Half-Saros cycle
A lunar eclipse will be preceded and followed by solar eclipses by 9 years and 5.5 days (a half saros). This lunar eclipse is related to two partial solar eclipses of Solar Saros 119.

See also 
List of lunar eclipses and List of 21st-century lunar eclipses

References

 2013 Apr 25: Partial Lunar Eclipse

External links

 
 Hermit eclipse: 2013-04-25
 APOD 2013/5/25 Caterpillar Moon

2013-04
2013 in science
April 2013 events